The Partner or The Associate (Spanish:El socio) is a 1928 novel by the Chilean writer and politician Jenaro Prieto.

Adaptations
The story, about a financially struggling man who invents a fictitious business partner named Davis to try to boost his fortunes, has been adapted into films on a number of occasions including:

 The Silent Partner (1939)
 The Mysterious Mr. Davis (1939)
 The Associate (1946)
 I Will Consult Mister Brown (1946)
 The Associate (1979)
 The Associate (1996)

References

Bibliography
 Salvatore Bizzarro. Historical Dictionary of Chile. Scarecrow Press, 2005.

1928 Chilean novels
Chilean novels adapted into films